Sura was a city in the southern part of the area called by ancient Jewish sources Babylonia, located east of the Euphrates. It was well-known for its agricultural produce, which included grapes, wheat, and barley. It was also a major center of Torah scholarship and home of an important yeshiva—the Sura Academy—which, together with the yeshivas in Pumbedita and Nehardea, gave rise to the Babylonian Talmud.

Location
According to Sherira Gaon, Sura was identical to the town of Mata Mehasya, which is also mentioned in the Talmud, but Mata Mehasya is cited in the Talmud many times, either as a nearby town or a suburb of Sura, and the Talmudist academy in Mata Mehasya served as a branch of Sura Academy, which was founded by Abba Arikha in the third century.

A contemporary Syriac source describes it as a town completely inhabited by Jews, situated between Māḥōzē and al-Hirah in the Sawad.

History

Byzantine–Sasanian wars
It was a [Byzantine] garrison of some importance in the Persian campaigns of Belisarius; and a full account is given of the circumstances under which it was taken and burned by Chosroes I. (A.D. 532), who, having marched three long days' journey from Circesium to Zenobia, along the course of the Euphrates, thence proceeded an equal distance up the river to Sura. Incidental mention of the bishop proves that it was then an episcopal see. (Procop. Bell. Pers. i. 18, ii. 5.) Its walls were so weak that it did not hold out more than half an hour; but it was afterwards more substantially fortified, by order of the emperor Justinian. (Id. de Aedificiis Justiniani, ii. 9.)"

See also
 History of the Jews in Iraq
 Talmudic Academies in Babylonia
 Peroz-Shapur, now Anbar (town), a town adjacent or identical to Nehardea; academy of Pumbedita was moved to this town for half of the sixth century
 Māḥōzē, modern-day al-Mada'in; the academy of Pumbedita was relocated to Māḥōzē during the time of the Amora Rava 
 Nehardea Academy (in Nehardea)
 Pumbedita Academy (in Pumbedita for most of its history; near what is now Fallujah)
 Pum-Nahara Academy
 Sura Academy
 Talmudic Academies in Syria Palaestina

References

Babylonia
Former populated places in Iraq
Jewish Babylonian history
Talmud places
Babylonian cities